Diego Gutierrez (born May 1, 1999) is an American professional soccer player who plays as a forward for Major League Soccer club Portland Timbers.

Youth and college
Gutierrez played high school soccer at Ralston High School, finishing his time there as the state's all-time leading goalscorer with 112 goals as well as tallying 43 assists. Gutierrez earned First Team All-Nebraska honors and was a four-time All-State selection. He also played club soccer with the Elite Academy.

In 2017, Gutierrez attended the University of Nebraska Omaha to play college soccer. Between 2017 and 2019, Gutierrez made 44 appearances for the Mavericks, scoring 10 goals and tallying 13 assists, getting named Summit League All-Newcomer Team and Summit League All-Tournament Team in 2017, and First Team All-Summit League in 2018.

In 2020, Gutierrez transferred to Creighton University for his senior year, scoring 15 goals in 30 appearances over two years with the 2020 season truncated due to the COVID-19 pandemic. Gutierrez was named Big East Offensive Player of the year and a two-time selection onto the All-Big East First Team. During the extended 2020–21 season, Gutierrez was drafted 70th overall in the 2021 MLS SuperDraft by Portland Timbers. He didn't immediately sign with the club, instead finishing 2021 at Creighton.

Professional career
On February 25, 2022, Gutierrez signed a one-year deal with Major League Soccer side Portland Timbers. He made his professional debut on March 12, 2022, appearing as an 87th–minute substitute during a 1–0 win over Austin FC.

Personal life
Gutierrez is of Mexican descent and holds dual American and Mexican citizenship.

Career statistics

Club

References

External links
Omaha Mavericks Profile
Creighton Bluejays Profile
Portland Timbers Website
 

1999 births
Living people
People from Omaha, Nebraska
Soccer players from Nebraska
American soccer players
American sportspeople of Mexican descent
Association football forwards
Creighton Bluejays men's soccer players
Major League Soccer players
MLS Next Pro players
Omaha Mavericks men's soccer players
Portland Timbers draft picks
Portland Timbers players
Portland Timbers 2 players